The Commisioners-General of the Dutch East Indies was a commission instituted by the Dutch king William I of the Netherlands in 1815 to implement the provisions of the Anglo-Dutch Treaty of 1814 and take over the government of the Dutch Indies from the British lieutenant-governor of Java, John Fendall Jr. . The commission consisted of the following three members: Godert van der Capellen, Arnold Adriaan Buyskes, and Cornelis Theodoor Elout.

Background
The British East India Company had, with help of the Royal Navy conquered the possessions of her former rival, the VOC (since the nationalization  of that entity claimed by the Batavian Republic and its successor states) in the East Indies in 1810 and 1811. Sir Stamford Raffles had as lieutenant-governor made an energetic start with the conversion of the institutions of the colony, but he built on the work of the last Dutch governor of Java, Herman Willem Daendels, who actually acted on the authority of the French Empire, as Napoleon had in 1810 annexed the Kingdom of Holland (the successor state to the Batavian Republic). When the Dutch state was resurrected in 1813 by the victorious allies, the British government deemed it politic to return most of the colonies of the Kingdom of Holland to this new sovereign entity (the Sovereign Principality of the United Netherlands at that moment in time). To that end the Anglo-Dutch Treaty of 1814 was concluded with the Sovereign Prince (as he then was), William I.

William made plans to implement the treaty by sending an expedition to the East Indies, but the project was delayed by the events of the Hundred Days. So the expedition could only depart in the Fall of 1815. By then he had become King of the United Kingdom of the Netherlands. He instituted theCommissie-Generaal as the Dutch name reads,  on 3 January 1815, and at the same time issued a draft of a Regeringsreglement (Constitutional Regulation)  that was intended to replace the last Regeringsreglement promulgated by Daendels (and still in place under Raffles, with amendments) . He handed this to the three Commissioners, Van der Capellen, Buyskes, and Elout with the intent that they should implement it in the Indies after taking over the government from the British. As it turned out the Commissioners never did this

Work of the Commission
The Commissie-Generaal set sail on 29 October 1815 from Texel aboard a Dutch navy squadron under command of the member of the Commissie-Generaal, Rear-Admiral Buyskes, consisting of Zr. Ms. Admiraal Evertsen (flagship), Zr. Ms. Amsterdam, Zr. Ms. Admiraal De Ruyter, Zr. Ms. Braband, Zr. Ms. Maria van Reigersbergen, Zr. Ms. Iris, and Zr. Ms. Spion.  On board of the De Ruyter were Buyskes and Elout, the botanist Caspar Georg Carl Reinwardt, and about 600 soldiers of the Indies Brigade who had served at the Battle of Waterloo, but now came to fulfill the original task of the brigade: defending the Dutch East Indies, under command of Carl Heinrich Wilhelm Anthing; another 1200 were spread over the remaining ships. The squadron arrived on the roadstead of Batavia on 21 May 1816.

It took until 18 August 1816 before Fendall finally handed over the government of Java to Van der Capellen, pleading a lack of instructions to do so from his superiors. In other parts of the Indies the handover took even longer. The Moluccas were transferred in early 1817; the former VOC possessions in India and on Malacca followed in 1818; and Sumatra in 1819. In this context it is important to point out that the Dutch kingdom acted as the successor of the VOC, and only exercised the rights that company had possessed previously. The VOC did not possess the entire area that now comprises the Republic of Indonesia. The VOC had conquered a large part of the island of Java, and exercised "direct rule" there. But other parts were still autonomous, like the Surakarta Sunanate and the Yogyakarta Sultanate. Elsewhere the Governorate of the Banda Islands was under direct rule, but the Sultanate of Ternate, that comprised other parts of the Moluccas, was a semi-autonomous vassal state. Other parts of the archipel were even more autonomous, though bound to the VOC (and later the Dutch colonial government) by (unequal) treaties, like Celebes. The handover of the government to the commissie-generaal was solemnly proclaimed on 19 August 1816, which at the same time also proclaimed Van der Capellen as the new Governor-General.

The Commissioners decided to leave the British amendments to  Daendel's Regeringsreglement in force for the time being. The old Council of the Indies was restored in its powers as a check on the Governor-General, though the Governor-General would be empowered to override the Council under certain circumstances. The Commissioners further decided to leave Raffles' cash-based land tenure system (know as the landrente) in place, as well as the monopolies from the time of the VOC, and the obligations for the population to plant and produce certain agricultural commodities. But they wished to study the possibility of lifting the spice monopoly in the Moluccas. The restrictions on commerce and shipping from the days of the VOC were lifted, opening up the Indies to commerce from other countries, except in the Moluccas. All European  residents would enjoy freedom to set up a business. Finally, the Commissioners decided to study the introduction of educational reforms, opening up the schools for Europeans to the indigenous population}}

But these were just provisional decisions. The Commissie-Generaal subsequently began its principal work on the formulation of a new Regeringsreglement that would be completed in 1818.

Interlude: the suppression of the insurrection of Pattimura
However, the work of the Commissie-Generaal especially of its member Buyskes, was interrupted in May 1817 by the insurrection on the island of Saparua in the Moluccas, led by the Christian Saparuan sergeant Thomas Matulessy, who had adopted the pseudonym Pattimura. The British had during their occupation of Saparua raised a regiment of mercenary soldiers, in which Matulessy had reached the rank of sergeant. When the Moluccas were handed over to the Dutch commissioners sent out by the Commissie-Generaal in early 1817, they had disbanded this regiment, causing great distress to Matulessy and his colleagues. The new Resident for Sapurua, Johannes Rudolph van den Berg had instituted a few other tactless and unpopular policies . This caused Matulessi/Pattimura and his followers to storm Fort Duurstede on Saparua and massacre the garrison and the Resident and his family

The subsequent punitive expedition sent out by the Dutch commissioners in the Moluccas had led to a disastrous result, and large loss of Dutch life. Only then saw these commissioners fit to inform the Commissie-Generaal. Van der Capellen decided that the Dutch Indies government had no option but to react severely. He realized the mistakes of the Moluccan commissioners, and sacked them forthwith. He appointed Buyskes in their place and charged him with the command of a military expedition to restore "law and order" in the Moluccas and punish the insurgents. 
Buyskes left on 27 June 1817 with about 250 soldiers aboard the Zr. Ms. Prins Frederik to Surabaya, where he joined the Zr. Ms. Amsterdam, and another 250 soldiers came aboard the Prins Fredrik and two transports. The expedition left for Celebes on 27 July. They reached Ternate on 1 September. There the Sultan was persuaded to supply twenty so-called "corra-corras" (indigenous armed proas) with a considerable number of impressed Ternatean soldiers. This flotilla arrived at the roadstead of Ambon, where it was joined by Zr. Ms. Nassau and Zr. Ms. Admiraal Evertsen. The corra-corras had each about 100 native soldiers aboard (both those from Ternate and from Tidore under the command of the princes Toessan and Doekimi), bringing the total to 2000 troops for the entire expedition

Formulation of the main subjects for the Regeringsreglement of 1818

Freedom of navigation
The instruction for the Commissie-Generaal had indicated a number of subjects that the new Regeringsreglement should regulate. One of those was the freedom of navigation in the archipel. Under the VOC that freedom had in principle been denied both to foreign-flagged shipping and to private Dutch merchants. But this was no longer an option. So the Commissioners studied the history of the policies applied to the subject in the time of the Company, and later under the Daendels regime, and the Raffles regime. The Commissioners concluded that the only solution to the problem would be to allow freedom of navigation to both foreign-flagged shipping and private Dutch shipping on an equal footing, but that Dutch shipping would be privileged by a tariff policy

Aftermath

Notes

References

Sources

 
 
 
 

 
Dutch East Indies
Dutch East Indies